Rockdale Ilinden Football Club (formerly known as the Rockdale City Suns Football Club from 1992 to 2020) is an Australian semi-professional soccer club based in Sydney suburb of Rockdale. Founded in 1969, by Australian Macedonian, the club competes in the highest men's competition in New South Wales, the National Premier League NSW. The club's home ground is Ilinden Sports Centre, located in the suburb of Rockdale, New South Wales.

History
The Rockdale Ilinden Soccer Club was formed in 1969 by a group of Macedonian Australians who gave the team the name "Ilinden" which has special meaning for all Macedonians throughout history. The club's first President Simon Zipevski laid the foundations as did the late Vlade Temelkovski who was president in 1978.

On the field, the highlights would have to be the grand final wins (of different leagues) in 1984, 2002 and 2006. The 1984 NSW First Division grand final team was coached by Ilija Takac, winning 3–2 over Inter Monaro at Marconi Stadium and is firmly entrenched in the memories of the Rockdale Ilinden supporters.

It took 18 years for Rockdale Ilinden to rejoice another First Grade Grand Final victory. In 2002 the coaching team of Mile Todoroski and Bill Pilovski led the team to an amazing Premiership/Championship double with only 1 loss in 24 games. In the grand final, they would meet the Hajduk Wanderers (who Rockdale defeated 5 goals to 3 just two weeks earlier in the semi final) in very rainy and windy conditions at the Rockdale Ilinden Sports Centre. The team was captained by Spase Najdoski who scored the only goal in the game which in turn was the winning goal in the grand final in front of a crowd of 3000 at Melita Stadium.

Four years later in 2006, Rockdale Ilinden would claim another grand final victory this time over Penrith Nepean United. Rockdale won 1–0 in front of a crowd of 2000 at Melita Stadium. Penrith Nepean United would gain promotion to the New South Wales Premier League as Rockdale's application would be denied by Football NSW due to the Rockdale Ilinden Sports Centre not meeting specific stadium criteria for the Premier League.

The Rockdale Ilinden Soccer Club has been led by a wide array of coaching identities over their history. Some of these coaches were great players in their playing days. Kaz Kulak, Archie Blue, Ilija Takac, Ati Abonyi, Ljubo Gojkovic, Geoff Hoggart, John Fleming (1980s), Ljubo Jancev, Bill Pilovski, Manfred Schaefer, Risto Gojkovski, Rale Rasic, Doug Utjesenovic, Bill Temelkovski, Bill Boskovski, Gerry Gomez (1990s), Mile Todoroski, Ivan Petkovic, Zlatko Nastevski and current coach Mike Grbevski.

Mile Todorovski, the 2008 Super League Coach of the Year was announced as the new coach for the 2009 season with all members/guests and players welcoming the announcement. Lee Sterrey, formerly the coach of Marconi Stallions, replaced him for the 2011 Premier League season. Hugo Sanchez was also named as the new Youth League head coach. The Club Committee also announced STOBI Int. as the new supplier of the playing strip and accessories for the 2009 season and beyond.

The 2009 Super League season officially began on 15 March 2009 with Rockdale Ilinden drawing 1–1 with the Northern Tigers at the Rockdale Ilinden Sports Centre. The club finished the season in first place on the ladder, claiming the Premiership and advancing to the finals. They were, however, eliminated during the preliminary final by the eventual champions Spirit FC 2 goals to nil.

On 12 October 2009, Football NSW announced that the Rockdale City Suns would be promoted to the Premier League competition for the 2010 season.

The 2013 season saw the appointment of Branko Culina as head coach, along with Ivan Petkovic as his assistant. The 2013 season has been the most successful season since promotion into the NSW Premier League, with the Rockdale City Suns finishing 4th in the regular season, beating Marconi Stallions, Sutherland Sharks and Sydney United on the road to the Grand Final, before going down to eventual winner, Bonnyrigg White Eagles, 1–0 in front of nearly 6,000 people at Penrith (Centrebet) Stadium.

The 2014 season saw the Rockdale Ilinden Sports Centre hosted the inaugural launch of the Westfield FFA Cup on 24 February. On the field, the Suns finished in 5th place, bowing out to Sydney Olympic 2–1 in the first week of the finals.

In 2015, Rockdale parted ways with Branko Culina after an indifferent start to the NPL NSW season, appointing the experienced player Paul Reid as player/coach. The side finished in 6th place, narrowly missing out on a finals spot. The turn of fortunes since his appointment saw Paul Reid retain the head coach role for the 2016 season, helped by assistant Matthew Ribarovski.

In 2016, the club finished the regular season in 4th position before losing their semifinal to Bonnyrigg White Eagles.

In 2017, the club finished the regular season in third position and eventually missed out on a grand final position following a penalty shoot-out loss to eventual winners Manly United. The club finished the season in third position in the NPL NSW 1 club championship as a result of its under 18's finishing the regular season in 2nd position, under 20s in 6th position, and first grade finishing in first grade.

FFA Cup

In 2015, Rockdale City Suns qualified for the Round of 32 of the FFA Cup for the first time - beating Rydalmere Lions, Arncliffe Aurora, Sydney University and Sutherland Sharks, and drawing Perth Soccer Club in the National Round of 32, played at the Ilinden Sports Centre on 5 August 2015. Rockdale came out on top that night in front of over 1,800 supporters, winning 3–1 with goals to Toufic Alameddine, Dylan Macallister and Marko Jesic. Rockdale then drew the A-League club Melbourne Victory in the Round of 16.

The match was moved to Jubilee Oval due to insufficient lighting at Ilinden Sports Centre. On 1 September 2015, an official crowd of 4,165 packed the Western and Southern stands of Jubilee Oval in a match that was broadcast live on Foxtel, with Melbourne Victory eventually coming out on top 3–2 in a tight match.

Rockdale City Suns failed to make the Round of 32 in 2016 or 2017.

In 2018, Rockdale City Suns qualified for the Round of 32 again - beating Glebe Wanderers, Bankstown United, Sydney United 58 and Blacktown City. On 1 August 2018, they faced the A-League club Sydney FC (the then FFA Cup holders and Minor Premiers from the previous A-League season) in the Round of 32. Rockdale utilised enhanced lighting to be able to play at Ilinden Sports Centre. The match was broadcast live on Foxtel and a crowd of 4,489 packed into the Ilinden Sports Centre. Although Rockdale scored the first goal, Sydney FC won 4–2 in the end.

Colours and badge
The primary club colours of Rockdale Ilinden are red and black with a secondary, less-used colour of white.

The Rockdale Ilinden badge has evolved over time from the early years of the club's founding in 1969. The current club badge which has been in use for some 25 years, contains the Vergina Sun, a symbol of the Argead Dynasty, an ancient Macedonian royal house, with the centre disc replaced by a traditional black and white soccer ball surrounded by the name of the club.

Ilinden Sports Centre Stadium
From its founding in 1969 through to 2009, the Club played their old home ground at the Rockdale Ilinden Sports Centre, except during 2001, when the proximity of construction of the M5 East Freeway caused them to relocate their home games to John Crehan Park in Wollongong, New South Wales. The club continued to enjoy considerable support during this time, due in part to the size of the ethnic Macedonian community in the Illawarra Region.

In 2008, the club announced that they would be moving 1 km south from the Rockdale Ilinden Sports Centre in Arncliffe to Bicentennial Park South in Rockdale. Bicentennial Park South was to be transformed into a new football ground meeting the stadium standards of Football NSW, with new turf laid, an underground irrigation system installed, and a new clubhouse and facilities building constructed.

On Saturday, 12 December 2009, the club officially opened its new facilities at Bicentennial Park South.

The Ilinden Sports Centre comprises a large modern club house, undercover seating for 1000 spectators, floodlighting to enable night matches to be played, and a state-of-the-art pop-up sprinkler system for the playing field.

On Wednesday 7 October, Rockdale City Council announced they would install a synthetic surface at Ilinden Sports centre, with a likely completion date scheduled for the start of the 2017 season.

In February 2018, the synthetic playing surface was officially opened, the first of its kind in the St. George area.

Youth teams and Juniors occupy the nearby sporting fields of Bicentennial Park East, which adjoins the main ground of the club by a footbridge.
In 2017, the Club fielded over 500 registered players in local SGFA competitions.

Chairman and coaches
The current president of the club is Dennis Loether. The current vice president is Lou Tasevski. The current treasurer is George Trajkovski. The current general manager and secretary is Louie Belevski. The current first grade head coach is Paul Dee, assisted by Nick Stavroulakis. The current 20s coach is Adrian Meneses, and the current NPL Youth President is Robbie Geroski. The club's head of football is Mr. Matthew Ribarovski. The current technical director is Ante Juric. The club's Goalkeeper coach is Trinity Allen. The previous chairman was Paul Goreski.

Players

Current squad
As of February 2023

Honours
 NSW National Premier League/ NSW Division One/ NSW Premier League:
Champions (1): 1984 (Division One)
Premiers (1): 2020
 NSW NPL Finals Series:
 Runners up (2): 2013, 2020
 Semi finalists (3): 2014, 2016, 2017
  NSW Division Two/ NSW Super League/ NSW League One:
Premiers (3): 1983 (Division Two), 2002, 2009
Champions (2): 2002, 2006
Top Goal scores:
2002/3 – Spase Najdoski 13 goals
2003/4 – Denis Alilovic 13 goals
2004/5 – Nickolce Bosevski 12 goals
2006 – Denis Alilovic 10 goals
2007 – Denis Alilovic 7 goals
2008 – Pece Apoleski 8 goals
2009 – Sam Awad 11 goals
2010 – Peter Apolevski 5 goals
2016- Dylan Macallister
2017- Jordan Figon
'''2022 - Alec Urosevski

References

External links
Rockdale Ilinden FC Official Website
Rockdale City Suns Web Archive Site
Football NSW

 
New South Wales Premier League teams
National Premier Leagues clubs
Soccer clubs in Sydney
Association football clubs established in 1969
1969 establishments in Australia
Macedonian sports clubs in Australia